Kerikam (Jawi: کريکم) is a coarse metal thread made of gold or silver used for embroidering. The term kerikam comes from the French word clinquant. It is an important material in the Malay art of embroidery, traditionally used by the Malays in Brunei, Indonesia, Malaysia and southern Thailand. Kerikam embroidery can be found on baju kurung, kebaya and tudung.

History

This art of using kerikam for embroidery originated from the court of Malaca sultanate, in the early 15th century. With the fall of the Malaca sultanate, the art spreads all over the Malay archipelago. It is known as kelingkan and kelengkan in Selangor, keringkam in Sarawak, teringkam or terekam in Terengganu, kelingkam and kelengkang in Kelantan. In Riau islands, it is known as Manto, in Palembang as mudawarah and in South Africa as mediora. All of these names carry the same meaning.

The used of kerikam was even mentioned in the Sejarah Melayu (Malay Annals) and Ranee Margaret Brooke's My Life in Sarawak: The Ranee of Sarawak.

Tudung Keringkam
Keringkam or Selayah is a traditional type of headscarf traditionally worn by women in the Malaysian state of Sarawak. It is handcrafted with fine
embroidery work, that complements the traditional Malay clothing of Sarawak. In the old days, Keringkam was only worn by the Malay royalty and nobility. However now, this traditional headscarf is often worn when attending special occasions such as weddings and cultural events. The term tudung keringkam is believed to be originated from kerikam, the name of the thread used for embroidery. This intricate craft of embroidery is also found in other states in Malaysia, such as Kelantan, Terengganu, Perak, and Johor.

See also

 Malaysian cultural outfits
 Culture of Malaysia

References

Cited texts

Malay culture
Malaysian culture
Malay clothing
History of Asian clothing